Rawail Singh is  Professor of Punjabi at Delhi University.  Member University Court and Member of Standing Committee of Delhi University. He is also Convenor of Punjabi Advisory Board of Sahitya Akademi, the National Academy of Letters. Besides he is on board of a number of national and international bodies, he has participated and contributed a lot to many of the literary and cultural events in India and abroad. Earlier, he was Secretary to Punjabi Academy, Government of Delhi for 14 years. He is also a renowned broadcaster. As Secretary, Punjabi Academy, he was instrumental to bring Punjabi literature, art and culture to centre stage.
He has authored a number of books in Punjabi Literature. As Editor of Peer journal " SAMDARSHI" in Punjabi he is experimenting with a number of subjects. His area of specialization is Punjabi Drama and Media Studies in Punjabi which is a rare combination.

Bibliography

Authored 

Punjab Di Lok Nat Parampara Te Punjabi Natak, Shilalekh Prakashan (2000)
Punjab Ki Lok Natya Parampara Evam Punjabi Natak, Punjabi Academy, Delhi(2005)
Balwant Gargi Maker of  Indian Literature, Sahitya Akademi, Govt. of India (2012)
Media : Viharik Adhayan, Gracious Books, Patiala (2012)
Media : Sabhyacharak Samrajvad, Arsee Publishers, Delhi (2013)

Translated Books 

Bharat De Panchhi, Publication Division, Govt. of India (1999)
Bharat Di Sansad, Ki, Kiyon Ate Kiven, National Book Trust (2001)
Bharat De Lok Naach, Publication Division, Govt. of India (2008)
Munia Rani, National Book Trust (2009)
Suno Kahani, Sahitya Akademi, Govt. of India (2010)
Bachiyan Ne Fadiya Chor, Sahitya Akademi, Govt. of India(2012)
Moran Wala Bagh, Sahitya Akademi, Govt. of India (2012)

Edited &Co-Edited Books 

Guru Gobind Singh Da Sirjna Sansar Punjabi Academy, Delhi (2000)
Sukhan Da Waris : Waris Shah, Sahitya Akademi, Govt. of India (2009)
Lok Nataki : Naat Roop, Shilalekh Prakashan, Delhi (2012)
Afzal Ahsan Randhawa De Natak, Punjabi Academy, Delhi (2013)
Yug Chintak Sutinder Singh Noor, Sahitya Academy, Delhi (2015)
Bharti Kahani, Punjabi Academy, Delhi.(2013)
Naarivad Ate Punjabi Sahit, Sahitya Akademi, Govt. of India.(2013)
Lok Nataki Naat Roop, Shilalekh Prakashan, Delhi(2013)
Chihan Vigyan, Punjabi Academy, Delhi (2000)  
Pyar Kav, Punjabi Academy, Delhi (2000)
Punjabi Bal Sahit, Vibhin Paripekh, Punjabi Academy, Delhi (2000)
Gurdial Singh Da Rachna Sansar, Punjabi Academy, Delhi (2001)
Samkali Pachhami Chintan, Punjabi Academy, Delhi (2001)
Punjabi Te Bharti Sahit : Tulna Ton Samvad Tak, Punjabi Academy, Delhi (2002)
Samkali Purabvadi Chintan, Punjabi Academy, Delhi (2002)
Samkali Punjabi Kavita Da Kav Shastar, Punjabi Academy, Delhi (2002)
Samkali Pachhmi Chintan, Punjabi Academy, 2002
Punjabi Te Bharti Sahit, Punjabi Academy (2002)
Balwant Gargi Dian Naat Jugtaan, Chetna Prakashan (2003)
Lok Yaan Ton Ghora Badshah, Punjabi Academy (2003)
Samkali Punjabi Sahit De Sarokar, Punjabi Academy, Delhi (2004)
Nawan Punjabi Novel Ik Adhayan, Punjabi Academy, Delhi (2006)
Prof. Pooran Singh : Punar Vishleshan, Punjabi Academy, Delhi (2006)
Balwant Gargi : Punar Mulankan, Punjabi Academy, Delhi (2008)
Guru Granth Sahib : Samajik Sabhyacharak Sarokar, Punjabi Academy, Delhi (2010)
European Punjabi Sahit, Punjabi Academy, Delhi (2013)
Nobel Kahaniyan, Punjabi Academy, Delhi  (2013)

Magazines 

Editing Punjabi Literary Magazines "Samdarshi" for Punjabi  Academy since the year 2000.

Association with professional bodies 
Convener, Punjabi Advisory Board, Sahitya Akademi.
Advisory Head, World Punjabi Organisation  (WPO)

Convener, Punjabi Board, Delhi Public Library.
Member, Executive World Punjabi Centre, Patiala
Member, Governing Board, Punjab Arts Council
Member, State Advisory Board, Language Department, Punjab.
Member Secretary, Punjabi Academy, Delhi.
Member Executive, Academy of Fine Arts & Letters, New Delhi.
Member Executive, Punjabi Sahit Academy, Ludhiana.
Member, High Power Committee for Development of Culture, Tourism & Heritage, Govt. of Punjab.
Member, Permanent Committee on Punjabi Development, Punjabi University, Patiala.
General Secretary, Centre for Punjabi Culture.
Vice Chairman, Advisory Council, Navi Mumbai Cultural Association, Navi Mumbai.
Honorary Consultant, Punjabi academy, Govt. of NCT Of Delhi

Other Works 
Presenting Live Commentary on All India Radio & Doordarshan from Gurdwara Raqab Ganj Sahib on the occasion of Birth Anniversary of Sri Guru Nanak Dev ji for the last 4 years.
Produced documentary based on Punjabi Folk Songs named "Deeva Bale Saari Raat".
Produced documentary based on the life and writings of eminent Punjabi Poet Hazara Singh Gurdaspuri.
Produced documentary based on the life and writings of eminent Punjabi Author Devendra Satyarthi.
Produced documentary based on the life and writings of eminent Punjabi Folk Singer Surinder Kaur.
Producing a half an hour daily programme named Punjabi Darshan being broadcast on Vividh Bharti Channel of A.I.R., Delhi for the last 12 years.
Produced a documentary based on the "Rural Games of the Punjab".
Written & Produced a documentary based on the "Punjabi Folk Form-Gugga".
Written & Produced a documentary based on the "Punjabi Folk Form-Bazigar".
Written & Produced a documentary based on the "Punjabi Folk Form-Naqaal".
Written, Produced & Directed a documentary based on the life and writings of eminent Punjabi Author Prabhjot Kaur.
Written & Produced a documentary based on the "Punjabi Folk Form-Jangam".
Written & Produced a documentary based on  "Marriage Songs of the Punjab".

Research Paper Presented 
Punjabi Manoranjan Udyog Di Arthik-Rajnaitik Naitikata  - (2–3 March 2012), Punjabi Academy, Delhi
Sahit Chintak: S.S.Noor-(23rd, March2012), Sahitya Akademi, Delhi
Contribution Of Dr M.S. Randhawa to Punjabi Literature- (7 November 2012) Language Deptt. Punjab
Videshi Punjabi sahit Pachhan tr Diaspora Di Samasiya-(4-5 January 2013), Punjabi Academy, Delhi
How to Attract Children towards Punjabi-(23 November 2013), Gurmat college, delhi
Presided Over the inaugural session of seminar" Ghadar Lehar Ate Punjabi sahit (3rd December2014) Sahitiya Akademi, delhi
Teaching of Punjabi Drama and Ikangi- (12 September 2014) DSGMC, Delhi
Why Education in Mother Tongue is Necessary- (22nd May,2015)  Gurmat College, Delhi
Punjabiyat : in the Context of Cinema and TV- (12–13 December 2014) Sahitya Akademi, Delhi
Punjabi Novel Adaption into Cinema and TV-(16 December 2014)World Punjabi Literature Conference, Punjabi University, Patiala
Punjabi Heritage and Culture, Sarab bharati Punjabi conference (5-6 September 2014), Punjabi university, Patiala
Punjabiyat- Vartman Ate Bhavikh Di Talash– (13–14 June 2015) World Punjabi Conference, Canada

References

External links
Rawail Singh |How to attract our youngsters towards Punjabi Language

Punjabi-language poets
Academic staff of Delhi University
Living people
1956 births